Resource Public Key Infrastructure (RPKI), also known as Resource Certification, is a specialized public key infrastructure (PKI) framework to support improved security for the Internet's BGP routing infrastructure.

RPKI provides a way to connect Internet number resource information (such as Autonomous System numbers and IP addresses) to a trust anchor. The certificate structure mirrors the way in which Internet number resources are distributed. That is, resources are initially distributed by the IANA to the regional Internet registries (RIRs), who in turn distribute them to local Internet registries (LIRs), who then distribute the resources to their customers. RPKI can be used by the legitimate holders of the resources to control the operation of Internet routing protocols to prevent route hijacking and other attacks. In particular, RPKI is used to secure the Border Gateway Protocol (BGP) through BGP Route Origin Validation (ROV), as well as Neighbor Discovery Protocol (ND) for IPv6 through the Secure Neighbor Discovery protocol (SEND).

The RPKI architecture is documented in RFC 6480.  The RPKI specification is documented in a spread out series of RFCs: RFC 6481, RFC 6482, RFC 6483, RFC 6484, RFC 6485, RFC 6486, RFC 6487, RFC 6488, RFC 6489, RFC 6490, RFC 6491, RFC 6492, and RFC 6493. SEND is documented in RFC 6494 and RFC 6495.  These RFCs are a product of the IETF's SIDR ("Secure Inter-Domain Routing") working group, and are based on a threat analysis which was documented in RFC 4593. These standards cover BGP origin validation, while path validation is provided by BGPsec, which has been standardized separately in RFC 8205. Several implementations for prefix origin validation already exist.

Resource Certificates and child objects 
RPKI uses X.509 PKI certificates (RFC 5280) with extensions for IP addresses and AS identifiers (RFC 3779). It allows the members of regional Internet registries, known as local Internet registries (LIRs), to obtain a resource certificate listing the Internet number resources they hold. This offers them validatable proof of holdership, though the certificate does not contain identity information. Using the resource certificate, LIRs can create cryptographic attestations about the route announcements they authorise to be made with the prefixes they hold. These attestations, called Route Origin Authorizations (ROAs), are described below.

Route Origin Authorizations 
A Route Origin Authorization (ROA) states which autonomous system (AS) is authorised to originate certain IP prefixes. In addition, it can determine the maximum length of the prefix that the AS is authorised to advertise.

Maximum prefix length 
The maximum prefix length is an optional field. When not defined, the AS is only authorised to advertise exactly the prefix specified. Any more specific announcement of the prefix will be considered invalid. This is a way to enforce aggregation and prevent hijacking through the announcement of a more specific prefix.

When present, this specifies the length of the most specific IP prefix that the AS is authorised to advertise.

RPKI route announcement validity 
When a ROA is created for a certain combination of origin AS and prefix, this will have an effect on the RPKI validity of one or more route announcements. They can be:

 VALID
 The route announcement is covered by at least one ROA
 INVALID
 The prefix is announced from an unauthorised AS. This means:
 There is a ROA for this prefix for another AS, but no ROA authorising this AS; or
 This could be a hijacking attempt
 The announcement is more specific than is allowed by the maximum length set in a ROA that matches the prefix and AS
 UNKNOWN
 The prefix in this announcement is not covered (or only partially covered) by an existing ROA

Note that invalid BGP updates may also be due to incorrectly configured ROAs.

Management 
There are open source tools available to run the certificate authority and manage the resource certificate and child objects such as ROAs. In addition, the RIRs have a hosted RPKI platform available in their member portals. This allows LIRs to choose to rely on a hosted system, or run their own software.

Publication 
The system does not use a single repository publication point to publish RPKI objects. Instead, the RPKI repository system consists of multiple distributed and delegated repository publication points. Each repository publication point is associated with one or more RPKI certificates' publication points. In practice this means that when running a certificate authority, an LIR can either publish all cryptographic material themselves, or they can rely on a third party for publication. When an LIR chooses to use the hosted system provided by the RIR, in principle publication is done in the RIR repository.

Validation 
Relying party software will fetch, cache, and validate repository data using rsync or the RPKI Repository Delta Protocol (RFC 8182).  It is important for a relying party to regularly synchronize with all the publication points to maintain a complete and timely view of repository data.  Incomplete or stale data can lead to erroneous routing decisions.

Routing decisions 
After validation of ROAs, the attestations can be compared to BGP routing and aid network operators in their decision making process. This can be done manually, but the validated prefix origin data can also be sent to a supported router using the RPKI to Router Protocol (RFC 6810), Cisco Systems offers native support on many platforms for fetching the RPKI data set and using it in the router configuration. Juniper offers support on all platforms that run version 12.2 or newer. Quagga obtains this functionality through BGP Secure Routing Extensions (BGP-SRx) or a RPKI implementation fully RFC-compliant based on RTRlib. The RTRlib provides an open source C implementation of the RTR protocol and prefix origin verification. The library is useful for developers of routing software but also for network operators. Developers can integrate the RTRlib into the BGP daemon to extend their implementation towards RPKI. Network operators may use the RTRlib to develop monitoring tools (e.g., to check the proper operation of caches or to evaluate their performance).

RFC 6494 updates the certificate validation method of the Secure Neighbor Discovery protocol (SEND) security mechanisms for Neighbor Discovery Protocol (ND) to use RPKI for use in IPv6. It defines a SEND certificate profile utilizing a modified RFC 6487 RPKI certificate profile which must include a single RFC 3779 IP address delegation extension.

References

External links 
 Tool provided by Cloudflare to test if ISP is doing RPKI validation
 Tool by Cloudflare to explore RPKI
 Open source RPKI Documentation
 IETF Journal - Securing BGP and SIDR
 An open source implementation of the complete set of RPKI protocols and tools
 RTRlib - Open source RPKI-Router Client C Library
 NLnet Labs open source RPKI tools developed in Rust
 Quagga RPKI implementation
 BGP-SrX - Quagga router implementation of RPKI-based Origin and Path validation.
 RPKI-Monitor - Global and regional monitoring and analysis of RPKI deployment and use.
 RPKI Deployment statistics for all RIRs
 Global ROA deployment heatmap
 EuroTransit GmbH RPKI Testbed
 BGPMON - Validating BGP announcement with RPKI
 An APNIC primer on RPKI
 RIPE NCC Resource Certification (RPKI) information
 LACNIC RPKI Information
 ARIN RPKI Information
 NRO statement on RPKI
 Internet Architecture Board statement on RPKI
 Building a new governance hierarchy: RPKI and the future of Internet routing and addressing
 Secure Border Gateway Protocol (Secure-BGP)
 RPKI Router Implementation Report

Public-key cryptography
Routing protocols
Internet architecture